Racket Girls (also called Blonde Pickup and Pin Down Girls) is an American film noir crime film, directed by Robert C. Dertano and released in 1951 by Screen Classics.

Plot

Umberto Scalli (Timothy Farrell) is a small-time gangster who acts as a manager for women's wrestling in order to cover his involvement in many crime rings, including racketeering, bookmaking, and prostitution. He must dodge both police investigations and the local mob, to which he owes $35,000.

Cast
Real life wrestlers Peaches Page and Rita Martinez, as well as former world champion Clara Mortensen, play fictional versions of themselves.

Peaches Page as Peaches Page
Timothy Farrell as Umberto Scalli
Clara Mortenson as Clara Mortensen, world champion
Rita Martínez as Rita Martinez, champion of Mexico
Muriel Gardner as Ruby McKenzie
Don Ferrara as Joe the Jockey
Matt Douglas as Ronnie, a mobster
Paul Merton as Monk, a book-keeper
Bruce Spencer as Eddie, a gangster
Tony Zarro as Lefty, a mobster
Mary Jean Walker as Jackie, a bookie
William Lamont as Senate investigator
Phil Bernard as Mr. Big, the gang leader
Jimmy Lennon Sr. as Jimmy Lennon
Phil Solomon as Phil Solomon, a referee

Production
The film was produced by George Weiss and Arena Productions, a Metro-Goldwyn-Mayer-based company headed by Norman Felton.

Derived works
The film was the subject of a 1994 episode of the sixth season of the movie-mocking show Mystery Science Theater 3000.

References

External links

American crime drama films
1951 films
1951 crime drama films
American black-and-white films
1950s English-language films
American independent films
1950s exploitation films
Women's professional wrestling films
1950s independent films
1950s American films